Barbados took part in the 2008 Summer Paralympics in Beijing, People's Republic of China. The country's delegation consisted of a single competitor, swimmer David Taylor. Taylor participated in two events and did not win a medal.

Swimming

See also
Barbados at the Paralympics
Barbados at the 2008 Summer Olympics

References
  

Nations at the 2008 Summer Paralympics
2008
Summer Paralympics